U-65 may refer to one of the following German submarines:

 , a German Type U 63 submarine
 During the First World War, Germany also had these submarines with similar names:
 , a German Type UB III submarine
 , a German Type UC II submarine
, a German Type IXB submarine

Submarines of Germany